Maicol Origlio (born 17 February 1997) is an Italian professional footballer who plays as a left-back.

Club career
On 10 June 2016, he signed with Monza. On 16 January 2019, he joined Giana Erminio on loan. On 18 July 2019, he joined Rende on loan.

Honours

Club 
Monza
Serie D: 2016-17
Scudetto Dilettanti: 2016-17

Follonica Gavorrano
Coppa Italia Serie D: 2021–22

References

1997 births
Footballers from Turin
Living people
Italian footballers
Association football fullbacks
A.C. Monza players
A.S. Giana Erminio players
Serie C players
Serie D players